Schinia gracilenta, the slender flower moth or iva flower moth, is a moth of the family Noctuidae. The species was first described by Jacob Hübner in 1818. It is found from the US states of New York to Florida and Nebraska to Arizona. The species is listed as endangered in Connecticut.

The wingspan is about 28 mm. There is one generation per year.

The larvae feed on the Iva genus, and possibly Brickellia eupatorioides.

References

Brou, Vernon Antoine Jr. (2007). "Schinia gracilenta Hubner in Louisiana". Southern Lepidopterists' News. 29 (4).

Schinia
Moths of North America
Moths described in 1818